Naomi van As (born 26 July 1983) is a Dutch field hockey player who plays as a forward/midfield for a Dutch club MHC Laren.

She made her debut for the Netherlands national team on 20 June 2003 in a game against South Africa. She was a part of the Dutch squad that became world champions at the 2006 Women's Hockey World Cup which also won the 2007 Champions Trophy. Her family lives in South Africa. In 2008, Van As became an Olympic gold medal winner with her national team at the 2008 Summer Olympics in Beijing, scoring the first goal in their 2–0 win over China. At the 2012 Summer Olympics, she was again part of the Dutch team that won gold. She finished her international sportive career at the 2016 Summer Olympics in Rio de Janeiro in the by shoot-outs lost final against the team of Great Britain. Van As was named FIH Player of the Year twice, both in 2009 and 2016.

In 2012, Van As was made a Knight of the Order of Orange-Nassau after she and the fellow members of her hockey team won the women's field hockey tournament at the 2012 Summer Olympics.

Since 2007, Van As has been in a long-term relationship with longtrack skater Sven Kramer, and they have a daughter (born in 2018) and a son (born in 2022).

References

External links
 

1983 births
Living people
Dutch female field hockey players
Field hockey players at the 2008 Summer Olympics
Field hockey players at the 2012 Summer Olympics
Medalists at the 2008 Summer Olympics
Medalists at the 2012 Summer Olympics
Olympic field hockey players of the Netherlands
Olympic gold medalists for the Netherlands
Olympic medalists in field hockey
Field hockey players from The Hague
Field hockey players at the 2016 Summer Olympics
Medalists at the 2016 Summer Olympics
Olympic silver medalists for the Netherlands
HC Klein Zwitserland players
Knights of the Order of Orange-Nassau
20th-century Dutch women
21st-century Dutch women